Rowthulapudi Mandal is one of the 21 mandals in Kakinada District of Andhra Pradesh. As per census 2011, there are 38 villages.

Demographics 
Rowthulapudi Mandal has total population of 55,236 as per the Census 2011 out of which 28,050 are males while 27,186 are females. The average Sex Ratio of Rowthulapudi Mandal is 969. The total literacy rate of Rowthulapudi Mandal is 51.11%. The male literacy rate is 50.2% and the female literacy rate is 40.4%.

Towns & Villages

Villages 

A. Mallavaram
Balarampuram
Bapabhupalapatnam
Billavaka
Chakirevulapalem
Challeru
D.Pydipala
Dabbadi
Dhara Jagannadhapuram
Diguva Sivada
Diguvadarapalle
Gangavaram
Gidajam
Ginnelaram
Gummaregula
Jaldam
Koduru
Kothuru
Latchireddipalem
Meraka Chamavaram
Mulagapudi
Namagiri Narendrapatnam
Pallapu Chamavaram
Parupaka
Pedduru
R.Venkatapuram
Raghavapatnam
Rajavaram
Ramakrishnapuram
Rowthulapudi
Santha Pydipala
Sarlanka
Satyavaram
Srungadhara Agraharam
Srungavaram
Tirupatammapeta
Uppampalem
Venakatanagaram

See also 
List of mandals in Andhra Pradesh

References 

Mandals in Kakinada district
Mandals in Andhra Pradesh